Porosozero is a rural locality (a settlement) in Suoyarvsky District of the Republic of Karelia, located along the Suna River. Municipally, it is a part and the administrative center of Porosozerskoye Rural Settlement of Suoyarvsky Municipal District. Population: 3,529 (2002 Census); 4,406 (1989 Census).

Before 1920 it was a municipality in the Ladoga Karelia by the Finnish border. The main source of livelihood is the forest industry.

History
The municipality of Porosozero was established in 1873.

After Finland's declaration of independence the parish became an issue in Finnish-Russian relations when its population held a vote in August 1918 to join Finland. The Finnish Army moved to occupy Porosozero in October. In the 1920 Treaty of Tartu, Finland gave up its claims on Porosozero and the neighboring Reboly, and instead received Petsamo in the far north, which had been annexed by Finland in 1918.

The inhabitants of Porosozero, however, did not give up, and in 1921 they started a rebellion against the Bolsheviks. The resistance movement, the Metsäsissit (literally Forest Guerillas) recruited volunteers from Finland and managed to capture large parts of East Karelia. The Bolsheviks fought back, and in 1922 the last guerillas withdrew to Finland.

During the negotiations preceding the Winter War, Joseph Stalin offered Reboly and Porosozero in exchange for a smaller area on the Karelian Isthmus. The offer was rejected.

Reboly was occupied in 1941–1944 by the Finnish 14th Division during the Continuation War, until it was recaptured by Soviet forces.

References

Geographic history of Finland
Rural localities in the Republic of Karelia
Suoyarvsky District
Former urban-type settlements of Karelia